The 2016–17 season of the Cypriot Futsal Cup is the 18th season of top-tier futsal in Cyprus. The regular season started on October 23, 2016, and will conclude in April 2017. The championship playoffs will follow the end of the regular season.

APOEL was the defending champions, winning its third title overall and in a row.

Bracket

First round
The first round draw took place on 19 October 2016 and the matches played on 23 and 24 October.

Quarter-finals
The Quarter-finals draw took place on 17 November 2016 and the matches played on 28 and 29 November.

Semi-finals
The Semi-finals draw took place on 4 January 2017 and the first leg matches played on 16 January and the second leg on 27 March.

First leg

Second leg

Final

See also	
 2016–17 Cypriot Futsal First Division

References

Futsal competitions in Cyprus